Liotella indigens is a species of minute sea snail, a marine gastropod mollusc in the family Skeneidae.

Description
The height of the shell attains 0.55 mm, its diameter 0.95 mm.

Distribution
This marine species is endemic to New Zealand and occurs off Three Kings Islands.

References

 Powell A. W. B., New Zealand Mollusca, William Collins Publishers Ltd, Auckland, New Zealand 1979 

indigens
Gastropods of New Zealand
Gastropods described in 1927
Taxa named by Harold John Finlay